Chang Sang (born 3 October 1939) became the first female Prime Minister of South Korea when President Kim Dae-jung reshuffled his cabinet in 2002.

She holds a doctorate of philosophy from Princeton Theological Seminary and served as president of  Ewha Womans University from 1996 until the prime minister appointment.

She was nominated as the prime minister candidate by the President Kim Dae-jung in 2002, however the nomination was rejected by the National Assembly.

Education
 Graduated, Sookmyung Girls' High School
 Bachelor of Science in Mathematics, Ewha Womans University
 Master of Divinity, Yale Divinity School at Yale University
 Doctor of Philosophy in Theology, Princeton Theological Seminary

References

External links
  Chang Sang - Official blog

1939 births
Government ministers of South Korea
Living people
Princeton Theological Seminary alumni
Women prime ministers
Yale Divinity School alumni
21st-century South Korean women politicians
21st-century South Korean politicians
Presidents of universities and colleges in South Korea